Little Women is a 2019 American coming-of-age period drama film written and directed by Greta Gerwig. It is the seventh film adaptation of the 1868 novel of the same name by Louisa May Alcott. The film chronicles the lives of the March sisters—Jo, Meg, Amy, and Beth—in Concord, Massachusetts, during the 19th century. Little Women stars an ensemble cast consisting of Saoirse Ronan, Emma Watson, Florence Pugh, Eliza Scanlen, Laura Dern, Timothée Chalamet, Meryl Streep, Tracy Letts, Bob Odenkirk, James Norton, Louis Garrel, and Chris Cooper.

Little Women had its world premiere at the Museum of Modern Art in New York City on December 7, 2019, and was theatrically released in the United States on December 25, 2019, by Sony Pictures Releasing. The film received critical acclaim, and was chosen by the American Film Institute as one of the top 10 films of the year. At the 92nd Academy Awards, it received six nominations, including Best Picture, Best Actress (Ronan), Best Supporting Actress (Pugh), Best Adapted Screenplay and Best Original Score, and won for Best Costume Design. It also received nominations for five British Academy Film Awards and two Golden Globe Awards.  At the 25th Critics' Choice Awards, it received nine nominations, winning for Best Adapted Screenplay.

Accolades

Notes

References

External links 
 

Lists of accolades by film
Sony-related lists